The Snow Queen is a interactive fiction game created by Irish developer St. Bride's School and published by Mosaic Publishing for the Commodore 64 and ZX Spectrum in 1985. It is based on the 1844 fairy tale "The Snow Queen" by Hans Christian Andersen.

Plot
The story closely follows the story of "The Snow Queen" by Hans Christian Andersen. The player takes on the role of Gerda, whose friend Kay has been kidnapped by the Snow Queen and taken to her home in the mountains. Gerda must attempt to rescue her friend.

Reception
The Snow Queen was generally moderately well received, including review scores of 60% from Computer Gamer, 21/30 from Computer & Video Games, 7/10 from Crash, four out of five stars from Sinclair User, 5/10 and 7/10 from Your Sinclair, and 60% from Zzap!64.

References

External links
 The Snow Queen at MobyGames
 The Snow Queen at World of Spectrum
 

1980s interactive fiction
1985 video games
Commodore 64 games
Fantasy video games
Mosaic Publishing games
Single-player video games
Video games about witchcraft
Video games based on fairy tales
Video games developed in Ireland
Video games featuring female protagonists
Video games set in Europe
Works based on The Snow Queen
ZX Spectrum games